There are two Epistles to the Corinthians in the Bible:

 First Epistle to the Corinthians
 Second Epistle to the Corinthians
 A Third Epistle to the Corinthians, once considered canonical by the Armenian Apostolic Church, now almost universally believed to be pseudepigraphical